
Francesco Goffriller (also Francesco Gofriller) (1692–1750) is considered one of the master Italian violin, viola and cello maker of the Venetian school.  He was thought to have been active between 1709 and 1739. 
Although long thought to be the brother of the Venetian luthier Matteo Goffriller, he is now known to have been his son. He worked as a luthier in Venice from approximately 1709 until 1714 when he moved to Udine. Notable musicians who used Francesco Goffriller cellos including Jacqueline du Pré, Pablo Casals and Daniel Müller-Schott.

Goffriller Instruments

Violins

Violas

Cellos 
Francesco Goffriller built many cellos in his lifetime.  These are several known to still exist.

References 

1692 births
1750 deaths
Businesspeople from Venice
Italian luthiers